NeXT Computer (also called the NeXT Computer System) is a workstation computer that was developed, marketed, and sold by  NeXT Inc. It was introduced in October 1988 as the company's first and flagship product, at a price of , aimed at the higher-education market. Its NeXTSTEP operating system is based on the Mach microkernel and BSD-derived Unix, with a proprietary GUI using a Display PostScript-based back end. The enclosure consists of a 1-foot die-cast magnesium cube-shaped black case, which led to the machine being informally referred to as "The Cube".

The NeXT Computer was renamed NeXTcube in a later upgrade. The NeXTstation, a more affordable version of the NeXTcube, was released in 1990.

Launch

The NeXT Computer was launched in October 1988 at a lavish invitation-only event, "NeXT Introduction – the Introduction to the NeXT Generation of Computers for Education" at the Louise M. Davies Symphony Hall in San Francisco, California. The next day, selected educators and software developers were invited to attend—for a $100 registration fee—the first public technical overview of the NeXT computer at an event called "The NeXT Day" at the San Francisco Hilton. It gave those interested in developing NeXT software an insight into the system's software architecture and object-oriented programming. Steve Jobs was the luncheon's speaker.

Reception

In 1989, BYTE magazine listed the NeXT Computer among the "Excellence" winners of the BYTE Awards, stating that it showed "what can be done when a personal computer is designed as a system, and not a collection of hardware elements". Citing as "truly innovative" the optical drive, DSP and object-oriented programming environment, it concluded that "the NeXT Computer is worth every penny of its $6,500 market price". It was, however, not a significant commercial success, failing to reach the level of high-volume sales like the Apple II, Commodore 64, Macintosh, or Microsoft Windows PCs.  The workstations were sold to universities, financial institutions, and government agencies.

Legacy

A NeXT Computer and its object-oriented development tools and libraries were used by Tim Berners-Lee and Robert Cailliau at CERN to develop the world's first web server (CERN httpd) and web browser (WorldWideWeb).

The NeXT platform was used by Jesse Tayler at Paget Press to develop the first electronic app store, called the Electronic AppWrapper, in the early 1990s. Issue #3 was first demonstrated to Steve Jobs at NeXTWorld Expo 1993.

Pioneering PC games Doom, Doom II, and Quake (with respective level editors) were developed by id Software on NeXT machines. Doom engine games such as Heretic, Hexen, and Strife were also developed on NeXT hardware using id's tools.

NeXT technology provisioned the first online food delivery system called CyberSlice, using GIS based geolocation, on which Steve Jobs performed the first online order of pizza with tomato and basil. CyberSlice was curated into the Inventions of the 20th Century, Computer Science at the Smithsonian Institution in Washington, D.C.

See also
 Previous, emulator of NeXT hardware
 NeXTstation
 NeXTcube
 NeXTcube Turbo
 NeXT character set

References

External links 

 Byte Magazine, November 1988: The NeXT Computer Facsimile,  Full text
 Simson Garfinkel's NeXT pages including NeXTWorld Magazine
 The Best of NeXT Collection
 NeXT Computer brochure (page 7 contains a full size image of the circuit board)
 old-computers.com — NeXTcube
 Photos of black hardware

Computer workstations
History of the Internet
NeXT
Steve Jobs
68k-based computers
32-bit computers